Head Full of Honey (lit.: Honey in the Head) is a 2014 German drama film directed by Til Schweiger. It was one of eight films shortlisted by Germany to be their submission for the Academy Award for Best Foreign Language Film at the 88th Academy Awards, but it lost out to Labyrinth of Lies.

Plot
Retired vet Amandus (Dieter Hallervorden) suffers from Alzheimer's disease. A speech he holds at his wife Margarete's funeral reveals his deteriorating mental state. When his son Niko (Til Schweiger) and his granddaughter Tilda (Emma Schweiger) visit him, they see that he can no longer live on his own because of his mental condition. Niko convinces Amandus to move into his house near Hamburg.

Niko is married to Sarah (Jeanette Hain), but their marriage is in danger because his wife has a romance with her boss Serge (Jan Josef Liefers). Amandus's presence in the household causes disputes between Niko and Sarah. For example, Amandus nearly causes a fire in the kitchen while trying to bake a cake, which Sarah only prevents in the nick of time.

While Amandus's mental state continues to degrade, a summer fête is thrown in the garden. Because of his disease, Amandus causes a disaster which leads to Sarah moving out. Niko now believes that moving his father to a retirement home has become inevitable, however his daughter Tilda does not think that this is the way Amandus should be treated. Instead, she wants to travel to Venice with her grandfather, where he and his wife Margarete had spent their honeymoon. Tilda is told by her paediatrician Dr. Ehlers (Tilo Prückner) that visiting places the sick person knows well can help living with the disease. They start their trip by car, but soon get into a car crash which is caused by Amandus ignoring a red traffic light. Tilda then decides that they should go by train, which also fails when Amandus accidentally leaves the train. Tilda pulls the emergency brake to stop the train and runs after him. The police are now searching for them, so they hide in a toilet cabin. In the evening, the janitor Erdal (Fahri Yardim) finds them and helps the two continue their journey to Venice. Going by a sheep lorry, they get stopped by the police but manage to flee before they get caught, and find shelter in a monastery. The Mother Superior (Claudia Michelsen) is so touched by their story that she drives Tilda and Amandus to Venice.

Niko and Sarah also arrive in Venice, looking for Tilda and Amandus. They check into the same hotel as Niko and Sarah, but they don't notice each other. Amandus leaves the hotel at night. Tilda notices in the morning, goes looking for him, and finds him sitting on a bench. It is revealed that while on honeymoon in Venice, Amandus had sat on that bench with his wife Margarete. His condition has advanced so far that he forgets he has a granddaughter, so he doesn't recognise Tilda. At that moment, Niko and Sarah find Tilda and Amandus, and the four travel back to Hamburg.

Sarah decides to stop working so that she can take care of Amandus. The marriage of Niko and Sarah is saved when Sarah gives birth to a baby boy nine months later, whom they name after his grandfather. Amandus spends his remaining days contently with his family, and dies of cardiac failure in Tilda's presence. At the funeral, Tilda lies in the grass and looks to the sky, because Amandus had promised he would protect her from heaven.

Cast
 Dieter Hallervorden – Amandus Rosenbach
 Emma Schweiger – Tilda Rosenbach
 Til Schweiger – Niko Rosenbach
 Jeanette Hain – Sarah Rosenbach
 Katharina Thalbach – Vivian Saalfeld
 Tilo Prückner – Dr. Ehlers
 Mehmet Kurtuluş – Dr. Holst
 Violetta Schurawlow – Nun
 Pasquale Aleardi – Police Officer
 Jan Josef Liefers – Serge
 Fahri Yardım – Erdal
 Samuel Koch

Reception
The film was the highest-grossing German film released in 2014 with a gross of US$63 million and is currently the third highest-grossing German film of all time.

US remake
On 21 March 2018, German media announced that Til Schweiger would create a remake of Honig im Kopf – with its literally-translated name, Honey in the Head – for the US market, with him as director and with Nick Nolte and Matt Dillon as main cast members. It was eventually also titled Head Full of Honey.

References

External links
 

2014 drama films
German drama films
Films about Alzheimer's disease
Films directed by Til Schweiger
Films scored by Martin Todsharow
2014 films
2010s German films